In mathematics, the nimbers, also called Grundy numbers, are introduced in combinatorial game theory, where they are defined as the values of heaps in the game Nim.  The nimbers are the ordinal numbers endowed with nimber addition and nimber multiplication, which are distinct from ordinal addition and ordinal multiplication.

Because of the Sprague–Grundy theorem which states that every impartial game is equivalent to a Nim heap of a certain size, nimbers arise in a much larger class of impartial games. They may also occur in partisan games like Domineering.

Nimbers have the characteristic that their Left and Right options are identical, following a certain schema, and that they are their own negatives, such that a positive ordinal may be added to another positive ordinal using nimber addition to find an ordinal of a lower value.  The minimum excludant operation is applied to sets of nimbers.

Uses

Nim 

Nim is a game in which two players take turns removing objects from distinct heaps. As moves depend only on the position and not on which of the two players is currently moving, and where the payoffs are symmetric, Nim is an impartial game. On each turn, a player must remove at least one object, and may remove any number of objects provided they all come from the same heap. The goal of the game is to be the player who removes the last object. The nimber of a heap is simply the number of objects in that heap. Using nim addition, one can calculate the nimber of the game as a whole. The winning strategy is to force the nimber of the game to 0 for the opponent's turn.

Cram 

Cram is a game often played on a rectangular board in which players take turns placing dominoes either horizontally or vertically until no more dominoes can be placed. The first player that cannot make a move loses. As the possible moves for both players are the same, it is an impartial game and can have a nimber value. For example, any board that is an even size by an even size will have a nimber of 0.  Any board that is even by odd will have a non-zero nimber.  Any  board will have a nimber of 0 for all even  and a nimber of 1 for all odd .

Northcott's Game 
A game where pegs for each player are placed along a column with a finite number of spaces. Each turn each player must move the piece up or down the column, but may not move past the other player's piece. Several columns are stacked together to add complexity. The player that can no longer make any moves loses. Unlike many other nimber related games, the number of spaces between the two tokens on each row are the sizes of the Nim heaps. If your opponent increases the number of spaces between two tokens, just decrease it on your next move. Else, play the game of Nim and make the Nim-sum of the number of spaces between the tokens on each row be 0.

Hackenbush 

Hackenbush is a game invented by mathematician John Horton Conway. It may be played on any configuration of colored line segments connected to one another by their endpoints and to a "ground" line. Players take turns removing line segments. An impartial game version, thereby a game able to be analyzed using nimbers, can be found by removing distinction from the lines, allowing either player to cut any branch. Any segments reliant on the newly removed segment in order to connect to the ground line are removed as well. In this way, each connection to the ground can be considered a nim heap with a nimber value. Additionally, all the separate connections to the ground line can also be summed for a nimber of the game state.

Addition 
Nimber addition (also known as nim-addition) can be used to calculate the size of a single nim heap equivalent to a collection of nim heaps.  It is defined recursively by
{{math|1=α ⊕ β = mex({{mset|α′ ⊕ β : ''α < α}} ∪ )}},

For finite ordinals, the nim-sum is easily evaluated on a computer by taking the bitwise exclusive or (XOR, denoted by ) of the corresponding numbers. For example, the nim-sum of 7 and 14 can be found by writing 7 as 111 and 14 as 1110; the ones place adds to 1; the twos place adds to 2, which we replace with 0; the fours place adds to 2, which we replace with 0; the eights place adds to 1. So the nim-sum is written in binary as 1001, or in decimal as 9.

This property of addition follows from the fact that both mex and XOR yield a winning strategy for Nim and there can be only one such strategy; or it can be shown directly by induction: Let  and  be two finite ordinals, and assume that the nim-sum of all pairs with one of them reduced is already defined.

 Multiplication 
Nimber multiplication (nim-multiplication''') is defined recursively by

.

Except for the fact that nimbers form a proper class and not a set, the class of nimbers determines an algebraically closed field of characteristic 2. The nimber additive identity is the ordinal 0, and the nimber multiplicative identity is the ordinal 1. In keeping with the characteristic being 2, the nimber additive inverse of the ordinal  is  itself.

For all natural numbers , the set of nimbers less than  form the Galois field  of order .

Just as in the case of nimber addition, there is a means of computing the nimber product of finite ordinals. This is determined by the rules that

 The nimber product of a Fermat 2-power (numbers of the form ) with a smaller number is equal to their ordinary product;

The smallest algebraically closed field of nimbers is the set of nimbers less than the ordinal , where  is the smallest infinite ordinal. It follows that as a nimber,  is transcendental over the field.

Addition and multiplication tables 
The following tables exhibit addition and multiplication among the first 16 nimbers. 
This subset is closed under both operations, since 16 is of the form .

See also
 Surreal number

Notes

References

 
 
  which discusses games, surreal numbers, and nimbers.

Combinatorial game theory
Finite fields
Ordinal numbers